Robert Dane Oliveri (born April 28, 1978) is an American former child actor. He is best known for his portrayal of Nick Szalinski in the 1989 Disney film, Honey, I Shrunk the Kids, for which he was nominated for a Young Artist Award and a Saturn Award. He reprised the role in the 1992 sequel, Honey, I Blew Up the Kid and the 3D short film, Honey, I Shrunk the Audience! He is also known for playing Kevin, Winona Ryder's younger brother, in Tim Burton's Edward Scissorhands.

Career
At age nine, Oliveri starred as Paul Bard in an episode of ABC Afterschool Special. Two years later he made a guest appearance on Friday the 13th: The Series  as Mike Carlson. That same year, he starred as Young Nelson in the television movie, Ask Me Again. Also that year, he landed the role of Nick Szalinski, the son of Rick Moranis's character in Honey, I Shrunk the Kids.

For his performance, he was nominated for a Young Artist Award and a Saturn Award. In 1990, Oliveri starred as Danny Flocken in the pilot of The Flockens, a show about raising four boys, which also starred Miriam Flynn and Bruce McGill as the parents. The show was not picked up and dismissed. He starred in a 1990 episode of the TV series Monsters and then landed the role of Kevin in Edward Scissorhands with Johnny Depp and Winona Ryder.

He later starred in an episode of ABC Weekend Special as Ryan in Ralph S. Mouse. The next year, Oliveri reprised his role as Nick Szalinski in 1992's Honey, I Blew Up the Kid. His character had matured since the previous film and took a liking to Mandy Park, which was Keri Russell's film debut. Oliveri was asked to reprise his role as Szalinski again two years later for the 3D science fiction short film used in the Honey, I Shrunk the Audience! attraction, at several Disney theme parks, from 1994 to 2010.

Filmography

External links
 

1978 births
Living people
American male child actors
American male film actors
Male actors from Los Angeles
20th-century American male actors